John Charles Bird (born 9 June 1948) is an English former professional footballer and manager.

Bird's transfer from Preston North End to Newcastle United in 1975 prompted the resignation of Preston manager Bobby Charlton. A week later, head coach and caretaker manager Nobby Stiles also resigned, although he returned to the club as manager two years later.

Life after football
After leaving football, Bird pursued his interest in art full-time, becoming a professional painter and gallery curator.

Managerial stats

References

External links

1948 births
Living people
Footballers from Doncaster
English footballers
Doncaster Rovers F.C. players
Preston North End F.C. players
Newcastle United F.C. players
Hartlepool United F.C. players
English Football League players
English football managers
Hartlepool United F.C. managers
York City F.C. managers
Halifax Town A.F.C. managers
English Football League managers
Hartlepool United F.C. non-playing staff
Doncaster Rovers F.C. non-playing staff
Association football defenders